Reginald Percy Todd (4 October 1889 – 8 October 1960) was an Australian rules footballer who played with Geelong in the Victorian Football League (VFL).

Notes

External links 

1889 births
1960 deaths
Australian rules footballers from Victoria (Australia)
Geelong Football Club players
Chilwell Football Club players